Sandra Vergara (born September 11, 1988) is a Colombian actress, television host and model. Since 2020, she has served as a correspondent for People magazine‘s series People (The TV Show). She is also the co-host and beauty expert of Yahoo!'s digital series Hook'd (2019–present).

Early life
Sandra Vergara Medina was born on September 11, 1988 in Colombia. She was adopted by her aunt at one month old, due to her biological mother's failing health.  Her mother, Margarita Vergara de Vergara, was a homemaker, and her father, Julio Enrique Vergara Robayo, was a cattle rancher for the meat industry. She is the cousin and adopted sister of actress Sofía Vergara and singer Veronica Vergara. Upon arriving to Los Angeles, she lived with sister Sofia for four years and worked as a wardrobe stylist and makeup artist. She worked with several celebrity clients, such as Jordana Brewster, Asia Argento, Bijou Phillips, Casey Johnson and Rumer Willis.

Career 
Vergara started her modeling at age 24, and appeared in pictorials for Maxim, Esquire and Regard. In 2009, she portrayed Beauty in the CBS police procedural drama series CSI: Miami, in the episode "Head Case". In 2010, Vergara appeared in 40 episodes of the soap opera Chico de mi Barrio as Sofia. She appeared in the horror film Fright Night (2011) as Ginger. In March 2011, Vergara was cast in the pilot of NBC's Mann's World. In 2013, she landed the role of Theresa Corazon in six episodes of the soap opera The Bold and the Beautiful.

She had guest roles on television shows such as Nip/Tuck, Eleventh Hour and CSI: Crime Scene Investigation. In 2015, she became the beauty expert and co-host of E!'s talk show revolving around plastic surgery titled Good Work, alongside RuPaul and Terry Dubrow. The show featured the hosts and guests discussing the "good work" and the "not so good work" of Hollywood celebrities regarding the quality of their plastic surgery. In 2019, she became the co-host of Yahoo!’s digital series Hook’d and a regular contributor to Yahoo! Lifestyle digital.

In August 2020, Variety announced that Vergara is serving as a Los Angeles correspondent for People magazine‘s new series People (The TV Show). The series premiered on September 14, 2020 on People'''s website, other People'' platforms, and on Meredith’s local television markets.

Filmography

References

External links

American adoptees
Living people
Colombian actresses
Colombian female models
Colombian emigrants to the United States
Hispanic and Latino American actresses
People from Barranquilla
1988 births
21st-century American women